Sir Harry Ralph Ricardo (26 January 1885 – 18 May 1974) was an English engineer who was one of the foremost engine designers and researchers in the early years of the development of the internal combustion engine.

Among his many other works, he improved the engines that were used in the first tanks, oversaw the research into the physics of internal combustion that led to the use of octane ratings, was instrumental in development of the sleeve valve engine design, and invented the Diesel "Comet" Swirl chamber that made high-speed diesel engines economically feasible.

Early life
Harry Ricardo was born at 13 Bedford Square, London, in 1885, the eldest of three children, and only son of Halsey Ricardo, the architect, and his wife Catherine Jane, daughter of Sir Alexander Meadows Rendel, a civil engineer.  Ricardo was descended from a brother of the famous political economist David Ricardo, a Sephardi Jew of Portuguese origin. He was one of the first people in England to see an automobile when his grandfather purchased one in 1898. He was from a relatively wealthy family and educated at Rugby School. In October 1903 he matriculated at Trinity College, Cambridge as a civil engineering student. Ricardo had been using tools and building engines since the age of ten.

Marriage
In 1911 Ricardo married Beatrice Bertha Hale, an art student at the Slade School of Art, in London. Her father, Charles Bowdich Hale, was the Ricardos' family doctor. They had three daughters, and lived most of their married life at Lancing and Edburton in West Sussex.

Car engines
He was then persuaded to join Bertram Hopkinson, Professor of Mechanism and Applied Mechanics, researching engine performance. He graduated in 1906 and spent another year researching at Cambridge.

Ricardo is said by Percy Kidner, then co-managing director of Vauxhall, to have had a hand in the design of the Vauxhall engine designed by Laurence Pomeroy for the RAC  trial of 1908.

Before graduation, Ricardo had designed a two-stroke motorcycle engine to study the effect of mixture strength upon the combustion process. When he graduated, the small firm of Messrs Lloyd and Plaister expressed interest in making the engine. Ricardo produced designs for two sizes, and the smaller one sold about 50 engines until 1914, when the war halted production.

In 1909 Ricardo designed a two-stroke 3.3-litre engine for his cousin Ralph Ricardo, who had established a small car manufacturing company, "Two Stroke Engine Company", at Shoreham-by-Sea. The engine was to be used in the Dolphin car. The cars were well made, but they cost more to make than the selling price. The company fared better making two-stroke engines for fishing boats. In 1911 the firm collapsed and Ralph departed for India. Ricardo continued to design engines for small electric lighting sets; these were produced by two companies until 1914.

Tank engines

In 1915 Ricardo set up a new company, "Engine Patents Ltd.", which developed the engine that would eventually be used in the first successful tank design, the British Mark V. The Daimler sleeve-valve engine used in the Mark I created copious amounts of smoke, which easily gave away its position. Ricardo was asked to look at the problem of reducing smoky exhaust gases and decided that a new engine was needed - despite the constraint that any new design would have to fit into the same space as the existing one. Existing companies were able to undertake construction of such an engine but not the design, so Ricardo designed it himself. As well as having reduced smoke emissions, the new engine was much more powerful than the existing ones. A total of over 8,000 of his tank engines were put into military service. The Mark IX tank, as well as the British version of the Mark VIII, also used a Ricardo engine. In addition to being fitted to tanks, several hundred of the  engines were used in France for providing power and light to base workshops, hospitals, camps, etc.

Aircraft engines
In 1917 his old mentor, Bertram Hopkinson, who was now Technical Director at the Air Ministry, invited Ricardo to join the new engine research facility at the Department of Military Aeronautics, later to become the RAE. In 1918 Hopkinson was killed while flying a Bristol Fighter, and Ricardo took over his position. From that point on the department produced a string of experimental engines and research reports that constantly drove the British, and world, engine industry.

One of Ricardo's first major research projects was on the problems of irregular combustion, known as knocking or pinging. To study the problem he built a unique variable-compression test engine. This led to the development of an octane rating system for fuels, and considerable investment into octane improving additives and refining systems. The dramatic reduction in fuel use as a result of higher-octane fuel was directly responsible for allowing Alcock and Brown to fly the Atlantic in their Vickers Vimy bombers adapted with his modifications.

Advances in engine design

In 1919 Ricardo was studying the phenomena affecting the combustion within the petrol engine and the diesel engine. He realised that turbulence within the combustion chamber increased flame speed, and that he could achieve this by offsetting the cylinder head. He also realised that making the chamber as compact as possible would reduce the distance that the flame had to travel and would reduce the likelihood of detonation. He later developed the induction swirl chamber, which was an attempt to achieve orderly air motion in a diesel engine, the swirl being initiated by inclined ports and accentuated by forcing the air into a small cylindrical volume. Finally he developed the compression swirl chamber for diesel engines. This design embodied intense swirl with a reasonable rate of pressure rise and good fuel consumption.

The compression swirl chamber design was called a "Comet" design (patented in 1931) and was subsequently licensed to a large number of companies for use in trucks, buses, tractors and cranes, as well as private cars and taxis. A Comet combustion chamber was used in the first Associated Equipment Company (AEC) diesel buses operated in 1931 by London General Omnibus Co, later part of the London Passenger Transport Board/London Transport. A later development of it featured in the world's first volume production diesel passenger car, the 1934 Citroën Rosalie. This meant that Britain led the world in the field of high-speed diesels for road transport at that time. This advantage was lost to the United Kingdom as a result of the heavy tax imposed on diesel fuel in the budget of 1938.

Ricardo designed the 1921 T.T. Vauxhall engine which was described by Cecil Clutton in Motor Sport as a tour de force in the 1922 RAC T. T. O Payne in the Ricardo Vauxhall came 3rd, Jean Chassagne on a 1921 Grand Prix Sunbeam winning outright. The engine was later developed by Mays and Villiers, who fitted a supercharger, and was still a winner fifteen years later.

In 1922 and 1923 Ricardo published a two-volume work "The Internal Combustion Engine".

In 1927 Ricardo formed Ricardo Consulting Engineers (now known as Ricardo plc) in Shoreham-by-Sea, which has become one of the foremost automotive consulting firms worldwide and is publicly listed on the London Stock Exchange.

Although Ricardo did not invent the sleeve valve, in 1927, he produced a seminal research paper that outlined the advantages of the sleeve valve, and suggested that poppet valve engines would not be able to offer power outputs much beyond 1500 hp (1,100 kW).  A number of sleeve valve aircraft engines were developed following this paper, notably by Napier, Bristol and Rolls-Royce. Bristol produced the Perseus, Hercules, Taurus and the Centaurus, Napier produced the Napier Sabre, and Rolls-Royce produced the Eagle and Crecy, all using sleeve valves.

In 1929 Ricardo was elected Fellow of the Royal Society.

World War II
Ricardo's work on the sleeve valve affected the development of British aircraft engines in the thirties and during the war. He enhanced the Rolls-Royce Merlin engine in the Mosquito by giving it an oxygen enrichment system to improve its performance.

Ricardo's work exerted influence globally. While his work guaranteed Britain a supply of fuels of ever-increasing power during the 1930s, it also helped Germany to develop synthetic high-octane aviation fuel, for example for the Focke-Wulf Fw 190 which inflicted heavy losses among the RAF's Supermarine Spitfires in 1942. Likewise, Ricardo's research on the detonation-inhibiting qualities of water injection was exploited by German engineers (MW 50) to provide their aero-engines with a high emergency power rating.

During 1941–1945 Ricardo was a member of the War Cabinet engineering advisory committee.

Ricardo also assisted in the design of the combustion chambers and fuel control system of Sir Frank Whittle's jet engine.

Post war period
In 1944 Ricardo was elected president of the Institution of Mechanical Engineers. In 1945 he and his wife moved from Shoreham-by-Sea to Graffham, also in West Sussex. In 1948 Ricardo was knighted in recognition for his work in the field of internal combustion engineering.

In 1964 Ricardo retired from active work in Ricardo Consulting Engineers but kept in touch with various engineers within the company.

In 1974, at the age of 89, Ricardo suffered a pelvic injury in a fall. He died six weeks later, on 18 May.

On 16 June 2005 a blue plaque was placed outside the house where Ricardo was born in Bedford Square, London. On 1 July 2010, the Institution of Mechanical Engineers bestowed an Engineering Heritage Award on Sir Harry Ricardo in recognition of his life and work as one of the foremost engineers of the twentieth century.  The first internal combustion engine which Harry Ricardo designed and built as a schoolboy currently displays this Engineering Heritage plaque in the Ricardo plc company exhibition area.

Ricardo plc

In 1915, Ricardo formed Engine Patents Ltd, the company which is today known as Ricardo plc. In this year he was contacted by the Royal Naval Air Service to help with the design of a device to manoeuvre battle tanks into position aboard railway wagons. Around 8000 engines were produced to power the tanks, making this engine the UK's first mass-produced internal combustion engine.  Many more of these engines found applications powering generators in workshops, hospitals and camps.  The success of this venture yielded £30,000 in royalties and led to Ricardo being able to buy the land and set up the company on its present site in 1919.

Books
  
  
  
  revised

See also
 British Rail 10100
 Francis Rodwell Banks
 Prosper L'Orange
 Ricardo plc
 Triumph Ricardo
 Triumph slant-four engine

References

External links

The Sir Harry Ricardo Laboratories at the University of Brighton
Sir Harry's Description of Combustion in Diesel Engines
Ricardo plc
SRH Systems
The Ricardo Exhibition at University of Cambridge Department of Engineering
A brief description of some of Sir Harry Ricardo's work 

1885 births
1974 deaths
People educated at Rugby School
Alumni of Trinity College, Cambridge
British automotive engineers
British motorcycle designers
English people of Portuguese-Jewish descent
Fellows of the Royal Society
Engineers from London
British motorcycle pioneers
British automotive pioneers
People associated with the internal combustion engine
20th-century British inventors
People from Lancing, West Sussex